Samuel Myerscough (1854–1932), was an acclaimed musician(organist), teacher and examiner. He was a Fellow of the Royal College of Organists and a Fellow of Trinity College London.

Samuel Myerscough was born in 1854 in Salford, Lancashire, England., a gifted musician, he was awarded the Royal College of Organists Medal in 1873. He graduated with a Bachelor of Music from Hertford College, Oxford in October 1881

He was appointed as assistant organist at Manchester Cathedral and the family moved there, he was a convert to Catholicism in 1899 accepted into the church by Fr. Bernard Vaughan S.J., gave up his job at the Cathedral and Dublin where he taught music in Loretto Abbey Rathfarnham.  The first son of Samuel and Mary Myerscough was born in Rochdale on 2 April 1879, called Samuel Sebastian Myerscough(1879-1954) and also a gifted musician and attained a Bachelor of Music at Oxford, became a Jesuit Priest, training at Oscott College Birmingham. His Daughter Alice Myerscough was also music teacher. The Myerscough family lived in 3 Fontenoy Terrace, Bray, Co Wicklow.

In 1904 he founded the Leinster School of Music & Drama The Musical Herald of 1 July 1909 wrote at length of Mr Myerscough‘s prominence in Irish musical life:

"The work by which Mr. Myerscough will be best remembered is the Leinster School of Music, of which he is the founder and inspiring force. .... Pupils came from as far north as Enniskillen, southwards from Waterford, and across from Galway."

He is listed as a member The Musical Association as "Myerscough, S., Esq., B.Mns. Oxon., F.R.C.O. (Liverpool)".

Professor Samuel Myerscough, Mus. Bac. Oxon, F.R.C.O., F.T.C. died 28 March 1932 aged 78 years and is buried in Deans Grange Cemetery, Co Dublin.

References

External links
- Leinster School of Music & Drama website
- The Royal Musical Association website
- The Royal College of Organists

1854 births
1932 deaths
Converts to Roman Catholicism
English classical organists
British male organists
Cathedral organists
People from Rochdale
Fellows of the Royal College of Organists
Male classical organists